Sir David John Edward Ratford  is a retired British diplomat and translator.

Early life 
David John Edward Ratford was born on 22 April 1934 to George Ratford and Lilian Ratford.

Ratford was educated at Whitgift Middle School. Ratford attended Selwyn College, Cambridge, graduating with a 1st class Honours degree in Medieval and Modern Languages.

Diplomatic career 
Ratford completed his national service in the Intelligence Corps from 1953 to 1955.

Ambassador to Norway 
Ratford was appointed the British Ambassador to Norway in 1990, succeeding Sir John Robson.

Ratford left this appointment in 1994.

Retirement 
In April 2004, Ratford signed an open letter to Prime Minister Tony Blair, expressing concern over Blair's policy on the Arab-Israel conflict and the Iraq war.

In December 2004, Ratford signed a further open letter, urging Blair to commission an independent inquiry into the number of civilian casualties in Iraq since the invasion.

Personal life 
Ratford married Ulla Monica in 1960.

References

External links 

 

1934 births
Living people
Ambassadors of the United Kingdom to Norway
Alumni of Selwyn College, Cambridge
British diplomats
Commanders of the Royal Victorian Order
Knights Commander of the Order of St Michael and St George